The Fingal District Football Association was an Australian rules football association in Fingal Valley, Tasmania from 1924 to 1992.  Football had been played in the Fingal region since 1884, when the Fingal Football Club was formed.

History
The history of the Association goes back to the 1880s when the town of Mathinna was thriving due to gold mining and had three teams that played each other regularly. At this time, like most competitions in Australia at the time, the team that won the most games were awarded the premiership.

There was a game between Fingal and St Marys recorded in 1884, but regular competition did not commence until the railway line was completed through the Fingal Valley in 1886. Two became three when Avoca joined. The Launceston Examiner reported on Saturday 9 August 1890 that a team from South Esk had journeyed to St Marys and played the local side with the visitors winning by seven points.

Only two Premierships have been recorded, from 1891 and 1907 with Avoca winning both. The odd game was played during World War One and the competition didn't reform again until 1922. The participating clubs in the return season were St Marys, Rovers (Cornwall-Mt Nicholas), Fingal, Avoca and Mathinna. The Association was in recess again from 1934 to 1935. In 1936 Rovers played a draw with Avoca in the grand final, but they refused to play the next week in the replay resulting in a forfeit. The very next year Avoca received another forfeit, this time from St Marys who had won the original game only for a protest to be upheld and the game ordered replayed. St Marys had already arranged for a game outside the Association and wanted a delay. When this was refused, they forfeited. The Association remained more of less stable until World War 2, when the competition went into recess once again. The Rovers failed to re-appear once the recess ended in 1945.

In 1945 St Helens, Rossarden and Swansea joined the competition bringing the club numbers to seven. Competition was healthy until the 1960s, when Mathinna started to struggle to get teams on the field. They finally folded in 1968, making way for Campbell Town to join the Association. By this time Rossarden were dominating the competition with players like the Lowe and Hawkins Brothers, Gus O’Boyle, Colin Cruikshank, Garry Tapp and coach Bob Miller. They won seven premierships between 1956 and 1967, with five in a row from 1961 to 1965.
	 
In the more recent years of the Association, the competition was looked after by longtime secretary Graham McGee. The players of the era included Bob Bye, Scott Marshall, John Smith, Jack Clements, Les Newman, John Thurley, Steven Salter, Colin Cruickshank, Gus O’Boyle, John and Patrick Cusick, Rob Lowe, Max Davison, Paul Ellis, Norm Barnes and Craig Woods.
	 
The last grand final of the Association was played at St Marys in 1992. St Helens defeated St Marys by 87 points. Campbell Town decided to enter the Northern Tasmanian Football Association leaving only four teams in the competition; St Marys, Fingal, St Helens and Swansea. Rossarden had folded after the 1972 season and Avoca had folded after winning the premiership in 1989. It was decided that a four team competition was not viable. Swansea headed for the Tasman Football Association, while St Helens went into the North East Association. St Marys and Fingal were forced to join Campbell Town in the NTFA.

Seniors

Spurr shield

1924 – St Marys 7.1.53 defeated Fingal 6.4.40
1925 – Rovers defeated Fingal
1926 – St Marys defeated St Helens
1927 – Fingal
1928 – Fingal 9.14.68 defeated St Marys 9.7.61
(St Marys won the first grand final but the game was ended with ten minutes to go. Fingal protested and the Fingal F.A. determined that the game had to be replayed and it took place two weeks after)
1929 – St Marys 8.12.60 defeated Fingal 8.4.52
1930 – St Marys 11.18.84 defeated Fingal 9.10.64
1931 – Fingal 5.12.42 defeated Mathinna 5.5.35
1932–1933 – unknown
1934–1935 In recess
1936 – Avoca defeated Rovers (Awarded to Avoca after Rovers refused to play in the replay grand final after the first game was drawn).
1937 – Avoca (St Marys forfeited)
1938 – Avoca
1939 – St Marys 13.11.89 defeated Fingal 10.14.74
1940–1944 Recess due to World War II
1945 – Fingal 8.10.58 defeated St Marys 7.14.56
1946 – St Marys 10.23.83 defeated Avoca 8.8.56
1947 – St Marys defeated 27.19.181 defeated Avoca 13.16.94
1948 – Fingal defeated St Marys
1949 – Fingal 8.16.64 defeated St Marys 6.17.53
1950 – Fingal 9.8.62 defeated St Marys 7.11.53
1951 – Avoca 7.10.52 defeated Fingal 7.7.49
1952 – Avoca 13.12.90 defeated St Marys 9.11.65
1953 – Fingal 7.18.60 defeated St Marys 7.12.54
1954 – Avoca 10.10.70 defeated Fingal 6.19.55
1955 – Fingal 6.12.48 defeated St Marys 4.19.43
1956 – Rossarden 9.21.75 defeated Fingal 7.4.46
1957 – Fingal 8.11.59 defeated St Marys 6.17.53
1958 – St Helens 9.9.63 defeated Fingal 5.6.36
1959 – Fingal 8.8.56 defeated Rossarden 7.12.54
1960 – St Helens 9.10.64 defeated Avoca 9.8.62
1961 – Rossarden 12.12.84 defeated Avoca 7.12.54
1962 – Rossarden 13.14.92 defeated St Helens 6.6.42
1963 – Rossarden 11.12.78 defeated St Helens 9.11.65
1964 – Rossarden 13.16.94 defeated Swansea 9.9.63
1965 – Rossarden 10.13.73 defeated Mathinna 6.14.50
1966 – Swansea 13.8.86 defeated Rossarden 5.16.46
1967 – Rossarden 10.17.77 defeated Swansea 4.8.32
1968 – Avoca 7.12.54 defeated Rossarden 7.5.47
1969 – Fingal 7.7.49 defeated St Marys 5.14.44
1970 – St Helens 7.5.47 defeated St Marys 6.7.43
1971 – Fingal 10.8.68 defeated St Marys 8.10.58
1972 – St Marys 16.5.101 defeated Avoca 12.15.87
1973 – Campbell Town 15.17.107 defeated St Helens 4.8.32
1974 – Campbell Town 8.12.60 defeated St Marys 8.5.53
1975 – Fingal 13.18.96 defeated Campbell Town 11.20.86
1976 – Campbell Town 18.20.120 defeated Fingal 10.9.69
1977 – Campbell Town 14.12.96 defeated 10.0.69
1978 – Swansea 16.14.110 defeated St Helens 11.12.78
1979 – Campbell Town 11.19.85 defeated Avoca 11.11.77
1980 – Avoca 17.12.114 defeated Campbell Town 11.10.76
1981 – Campbell Town 14.9.93 defeated Avoca 13.11.89
1982 – Swansea 19.12.126 defeated Fingal 13.10.88
1983 – St Marys 10.9.69 defeated Fingal 8.10.58
1984 – St Helens 7.6.48 defeated St Marys 5.16.46
1985 – St Helens 17.9.111 defeated Swansea 8.8.56
1986 – Avoca 14.9.93 defeated St Helens 13.8.86
1987 – St Helens 14.5.89 defeated Campbell Town 12.10.82
1988 – Fingal 11.16.82 defeated Swansea 7.10.52
1989 – Avoca 18.16.124 defeated St Helens 14.14.98
1990 – St Marys 14.14.98 defeated Fingal 8.11.59
1991 – St Marys 17.14.116 defeated Fingal 9.10.64
1992 – St Helens 15.17.107 defeated St Marys 3.2.20

Best and Fairest
Best and fairest in the seniors was presented the Athol "Curly" Ellis Memorial Trophy

1951 – John Francis (Fingal)
1952 – John Francis (Fingal)
1953 – John Francis (Fingal)
1954 – Eric Furley (Avoca)
1955–1960 – unavailable
1961 – Richard Press (Swansea)
1962 – Max Davidson (Avoca)
1963 – Wayne Freeman (Fingal)
1964 – John Smith (Fingal)
1965 – John Smith (Fingal)
1966 – Stan Graham (Swansea)
1967–1969 – unavailable
1970 – Robert Bye (St Marys)
1971 – Kevin Youd (Avoca)
1972 – Graeme White (Avoca)

1973 – Scott Marshall (Fingal)
1974 – Derek Chapple (St Helens)
1975 – Terry Freeman (Fingal)
1976 – Scott Marshall (Fingal)
1977 – Brendan Manion (St Marys)
1978 – Robert Simpson (St Helens)
1979 – Scott Marshall (Fingal)
1980 – Scott Marshall (Fingal)
1981 – Stephen Cook (St Marys)
1982 – Leon Grice (Swansea)
1983 – Mark Donnellan (Fingal)
1984 – John Thurley (St Helens)
1985 – Andrew Bryan (Avoca)
1986 – Mark Harris (Avoca)
1987 – Ambrose McDonald (Campbell Town)
1988 – Kerry Murfett (Avoca)
1989 – Andrew Viney (St Marys)
1990 – Patrick Cusick (Swansea)
1991 – Lyndon Dakin (St Marys)
1992– Patrick Cusick (Swansea)

Leading Goal Kickers

References

Australian Rules football in Tasmania – John Stoward – 2002, 

Defunct Australian rules football competitions in Tasmania